Onhaye is a municipality of Wallonia located in the province of Namur, Belgium. 

On 1 January 2006 Onhaye had a total population of 3,120.

The municipality consists of the following districts: Anthée, Falaën, Gerin, Onhaye, Serville, Sommière, and Weillen.

The region is home to several cultural heritage monuments, such as Château de Fontaine and the fortified farmhouse Falaën Castle.

See also
 List of protected heritage sites in Onhaye

References

External links
 

Municipalities of Namur (province)